The hyphen-minus  is the most commonly used type of hyphen, widely used in digital documents. It is the only character that resembles a minus sign or a dash in many character sets such as ASCII or on most keyboards, so it is also used as such. The name "hyphen-minus" derives from the original ASCII standard, where it was called "hyphen(minus)". The character is referred to as a "hyphen", a "minus sign", or a "dash" according to the context where it is being used.

Description

In early monospaced font typewriters and character encodings, a single key/code was almost always used for hyphen, minus, various dashes, and strikethrough, since they all have a roughly similar appearance. The current Unicode Standard specifies distinct characters for a number of different dashes, an unambiguous minus sign ("Unicode minus") at code point U+2212, and various types of hyphen including the unambiguous "Unicode hyphen" at U+2010 and the hyphen-minus at U+002D. When a hyphen is called for, the hyphen-minus is a common choice as it is well known, easy to enter on keyboards, and still the only form recognised by many data formats and computer languages. Though the Unicode Standard states that the U+2010 hyphen is "preferred" over the hyphen-minus, the standard itself uses the hyphen-minus as its hyphen character.

In most modern fonts, the hyphen-minus is identical or very similar to the "Unicode hyphen".

In mathematical texts that include the plus sign, use of the hyphen-minus as a minus sign typically results in an unattractive appearance. Unlike the Unicode minus sign, the hyphen-minus is generally smaller and at a different height than the horizontal line in the plus sign; see the image above.

Further, many word processors will word wrap at a hyphen-minus, but not after the "Unicode hyphen" sign.

Uses

Typing 

This character is typed when a hyphen or a minus sign is wanted. Based on old typewriter conventions, it is common to use a pair  to represent an em dash , and to put spaces around it  to represent a spaced en dash .  Some word processors automatically convert these to the correct dash. The character can also be typed multiple times to simulate a horizontal line (though in most cases, repeated entry of the underscore will produce a solid line). Alternating the hyphen-minus with spaces produces a "dashed" line, often to indicate where paper is to be cut. On a typewriter, over-striking a section of text with this is used for strikethrough.

Programming languages 

Most programming languages use the hyphen-minus for denoting subtraction and negation. It is almost never used to indicate a range, due to ambiguity with subtraction. Generally other characters, such as the Unicode  are not recognized.

In some programming languages (for example MySQL)  (two hyphen-minus) mark the beginning of a comment. It can be used to start the signature block in Usenet news system. YAML uses  (three hyphen-minuses) to end a section.

Command line 

The hyphen-minus character is often used when specifying command-line options, a convention popularized by Unix. A user can specify both by using -Rq. These are easier to understand when reading commands (some software does not care about the number of hyphen-minuses, and either does not allow combinations of single-letter options, or requires the user to rearrange them, so they do not match a long option). A double hyphen-minus by itself (followed by a space) indicates that there are no more options, which is useful when one needs to specify a filename that starts with a hyphen-minus. An option of just a hyphen-minus (followed by a space) may be recognized in lieu of a filename and indicates that stdin is to be read.

Encoding
It is also in ASCII with the same value.

See also
 -- (disambiguation)
 Box-drawing characters including  (U+2500), useful for drawing horizontal lines
 Hyphen
 Soft hyphen

Explanatory notes

References

External links 
 

Punctuation
Typographical symbols